USS Lyra (AK-101) was a  in the service of the US Navy in World War II. It was the only ship of the Navy to have borne this name. It is named after the constellation Lyra.

Construction
Lyra was laid down 25 April 1943 as Liberty ship SS Cyrus Hamlin, MCE hull 1555, by Permanente Metals Corporation, Yard No. 1, Richmond, California, under a Maritime Commission (MARCOM) contract; renamed Lyra 27 May 1943; launched 28 May 1943; sponsored by Mrs. Harry N. Nelson; acquired by the Navy 10 June 1943; converted by General Engineering & Drydock Co., San Francisco, California, completed 22 July 1943; and commissioned 22 July 1943.

Service history
Lyra departed San Francisco 28 August 1943, with 8,000 tons of lend-lease cargo for New Zealand. En route she towed one unit of a sectional dock to Espiritu Santo, New Hebrides, and arrived Wellington, New Zealand, 19 October. The cargo ship returned to San Francisco 24 November. On 17 December she began a three-day experimental run to help perfect towing techniques.

Two days after Christmas, she again departed for Espiritu Santo towing Auxiliary Repair Dry Dock . The ship then proceeded to Tulagi and Munda, Solomon Islands, embarking 200 troops from the latter for transport to Guadalcanal, which she reached 29 February 1944. Lyra returned to Tulagi and Guadalcanal, and was back in San Francisco 2 April after steaming . From 29 April to 30 June, she made two short voyages between the west coast and Pearl Harbor.

The cargo ship's next assignment was a towing operation to Manus, Admiralty Islands, between 21 August and 15 January 1945. On 26 February she voyaged to Samar, Philippine Islands, and returned to home port 1 June. Her seventh voyage, 17 June to 24 August, took her to Honolulu and Saipan. She sailed from San Francisco 26 September to Samar for her last assignment before decommissioning in Norfolk 3 May 1946. Lyra was redelivered to War Shipping Administration (WSA) 5 days later. She was sold 7 January 1947, to A. G. Pappadakis and operated out of Piraeus, Greece, as Virginia.

Notes

Citations

Bibliography 

Online resources

External links
 

Crater-class cargo ships
World War II auxiliary ships of the United States
Ships built in Richmond, California
1943 ships